Darwin is a surname that is a modern spelling of Anglo-Saxon and Old English name Deorwine. Notable people with the surname include:

Members of Charles Darwin's family:
Anne Darwin (1841–1851), daughter of Charles Darwin (1809–1882)
Bernard Darwin (1876–1961), golf writer
Charles Darwin (1809–1882), English naturalist and writer
Charles Darwin (1758–1778) physician and scientist, uncle of Charles Darwin (1809–1882)
Sir Charles Galton Darwin (1887–1962), physicist
Charles Waring Darwin (infant) (1856–1858), youngest son of Charles Darwin (1809–1882)
Charles Waring Darwin (soldier) (1855–1928), second cousin once removed of Charles Darwin (1809–1882)
Edward Levett Darwin (1821–1901), solicitor and author
Elinor Darwin (1871–1954), illustrator, engraver and portrait painter, wife of Bernard Darwin
Emma Darwin née Wedgwood (1808–1896), wife of Charles Darwin (1809–1882)
Emma Darwin (novelist) (born 1964), novelist
Erasmus Darwin (1731–1802), physician and biologist, grandfather of Charles Darwin (1809–1882)
Erasmus Darwin IV (1881–1915), businessman and soldier, son of Sir Horace Darwin
Erasmus Alvey Darwin (1804–1881), brother of Charles Darwin (1809–1882)
Etty Darwin, better known as Henrietta Litchfield (1843–1929), daughter of Charles Darwin (1809–1882)
Sir Francis Darwin (1848–1925), botanist
Sir Francis Sacheverel Darwin (1786–1859), physician and traveler
Sir George Darwin (1845–1912), astronomer and mathematician
Gwendoline Mary Darwin, birth name of Gwen Raverat (1885–1957), artist
Sir Horace Darwin (1851–1928), civil engineer
Ida Darwin (1854–1946), mental health campaigner, wife of Sir Horace Darwin
Leonard Darwin (1850–1943), soldier, politician, and activist
Emma Nora Darwin, birth name of Nora Barlow (1885–1989), editor and biographer of Charles Darwin (1809–1882)
Robert Darwin (1766–1848), physician, father of Charles Darwin (1809–1882)
Robert Waring Darwin of Elston (1724–1816), author of Principia Botanica
Robin Darwin (1910–1974), artist
Ursula Frances Elinor Darwin, birth name of Ursula Mommens (1908–2010), potter
William Erasmus Darwin (1839–1914), eldest son of Charles Darwin (1809–1882)
Ben Darwin (born 1976), Australian international Rugby player
Bobby Darwin, (born 1943), American baseball player
Charles Darwin (disambiguation), several people
Danny Darwin (born 1955), American baseball player
Donald Victor Darwin (1896–1972) Australian road engineer
George Darwin (footballer) (born 1932), English footballer
Jeff Darwin (born 1969), American baseball player
John Darwin (disambiguation), several people
Mike Darwin (born 1955), American writer and activist

See also

Derwin, given name and surname
Darwin (given name)

Surnames from given names
English-language surnames